Lahıc (also, Lagich and Laidzh) is a village and municipality in the Zaqatala Rayon of Azerbaijan.  It has a population of 1,954.  The municipality consists of the villages of Lahıc and Sabunçu.

References

External links

Populated places in Zaqatala District